Federal Highways, are a series of highways that connect with roads from foreign countries; link two or more states of the Federation; and are wholly or mostly built by the Federation with federal funds or through federal grants by individuals, states, or municipalities. Locally known as federal highway corridors, built and maintained by the federal government of Mexico via the Secretariat of Communications and Transportation (SCT). Federal Highways in Mexico can be classified into high-speed roads with restricted access (usually toll highways that may be segmented, and are marked by the letter "D") and low-speed roads with non-restricted access; not all corridors are completely improved.

High speed with restricted-access roads
Restricted-access roads, known as autopistas or carreteras de cobro, are limited-access expressways with controlled points of access interchanges. Access to these roads is generally prohibited for pedestrians and animal-drawn vehicles, as fences are located at the side of the road for most of the length. Autopistas are highways with four or more defined lanes. Supercarreteras are always two-lane highways and are most commonly found in mountainous areas. In some cases, the maximum speed can be .

Low speed with non-restricted-access roads
Low-speed/non-restricted-access roads, known as autopistas or  carreteras, comprise the majority of the road corridors. Autopistas are divided highways with four or more lanes. Most of these autopistas are single-carriageway roads converted into dual carriageway by building an adjacent road body next to the existing one. Carreteras are free, and in most cases, two-lane highways that connect almost all of Mexico. These roads have interchanges at major roads, but most intersections are at grade.

Numbering system
North–south highways are assigned odd numbers, while east-west highways are identified by even numbers. The start of the numbering system is located in the northwest of the country.

Exceptions to the numbering system
There are two exceptions to the numbering system:

 Federal Highway 14 (Fed. 14) and Federal Highway 14D (Fed. 14D) from Uruapan, Michoacán, to Morelia, Michoacán, located in the midwest of the country.
 Several roads with letter designations: the Autopista Arco Norte (M40D), Fed. I-20D (Libramiento de Irapuato), Fed. S30 (Libramiento Norponiente de Saltillo, signed as 40D) and, Fed. GUA 10D (Macrolibramiento Sur De Guadalajara).

Incidents 

 Mexico toll booth interstate disaster
 Chiapas truck crash

See also
List of Mexican Federal Highways
List of Mexican autopistas

References

External links
Mexico Secretaria of Comunicaciones y Transportes Official maps of federal highways - in Spanish
10 Facts You Should Know About Driving to Mexico
Green Angels Roadside Assistance on Mexican Federal Highways